The Grenada worm snake or Grenada Bank blindsnake (Amerotyphlops tasymicris) is a species of blind snake that is endemic to Grenada, an island in the Caribbean Lesser Antilles.

It reaches a total length of 180 mm.  It has light lines on its dorsal surface, and its ventral surface is unpigmented.

References
Notes

Sources

External links
Typhlops tasymicris at the Encyclopedia of Life
Amerotyphlops tasymicris at the Reptile Database

Amerotyphlops
Snakes of the Caribbean
Fauna of Grenada
Endemic fauna of Grenada
Reptiles described in 1974